The UNLV Rebels softball team represents the University of Nevada, Las Vegas in NCAA Division I college softball. The team participates in the Mountain West Conference. The Rebels are currently led by head coach Kristie Fox. The team plays its home games at Eller Media Stadium located on the university's campus.

Year-by-year results

Roster
As of March 10, 2018.

2018 Softball Roster

See also
List of NCAA Division I softball programs

References

External links